Chon is both a given name and a surname. Notable people with the name include:

Chon Gallegos (born 1939), American football player
Chon Wolson, Japanese soprano
Justin Chon (born 1981), American actor, director, and YouTube personality
Katherine Chon, co-founder of Polaris Project